The Golden Circle of Golf Festival was a golf tournament on the LPGA Tour, played only in 1961. It was played at the DeSota Lakes Golf & Country Club in Sarasota, Florida. Louise Suggs won the event.

References

Former LPGA Tour events
Golf in Florida
1961 establishments in Florida
1961 disestablishments in Florida
Women's sports in Florida